The European Agreement on Au Pair Placement is an international agreement within the Council of Europe, originally signed in Strasbourg, France on 24 November 1969. It came into force on 30 May 1971, and regulates au pair placements. It states that the placed person shall neither be seen as a traditional employed domestic worker nor as a traditional student.

List

References

See also
List of Council of Europe treaties

Au pairs
1969 in France
Council of Europe treaties
20th century in Strasbourg
Treaties concluded in 1969
Treaties entered into force in 1971
Treaties of Belgium
Treaties of Bulgaria
Treaties of Denmark
Treaties of Finland
Treaties of France
Treaties of Germany
Treaties of Greece
Treaties of Italy
Treaties of Luxembourg
Treaties of Moldova
Treaties of Norway
Treaties of Spain
Treaties of Switzerland
Treaties of West Germany
November 1969 events in Europe